The 2017–18 UNC Wilmington Seahawks women's basketball team represents the University of North Carolina Wilmington during the 2017–18 NCAA Division I women's basketball season. The Seahawks, led by first year head coach Karen Barefoot, play their home games at the Trask Coliseum and were members of the Colonial Athletic Association (CAA). They finished the season 12–19, 4–14 in CAA play to finish in a tie for eight place. They advance to the quarterfinals of the CAA women's tournament where they lost to Drexel.

Roster

Schedule

|-
!colspan=9 style=| Exhibition

|-
!colspan=9 style=| Non-conference regular season

|-
!colspan=9 style=| CAA regular season

|-
!colspan=9 style=| CAA Women's Tournament

See also
2017–18 UNC Wilmington Seahawks men's basketball team

References

UNC Wilmington Seahawks women's basketball seasons
UNC Wilmington